The 1906 VPI football team represented Virginia Agricultural and Mechanical College and Polytechnic Institute in the 1906 college football season. The team was led by their head coach Sally Miles and finished with a record of five wins, two losses, and two ties (5–2–2).

Schedule

Game summaries

Davidson
The VPI-Davidson game was originally scheduled to be played in Roanoke, Virginia, but was moved to Lynchburg, Virginia at the request of VPI.

Players
The following players were members of the 1906 football team according to the roster published in the 1907 edition of The Bugle, the Virginia Tech yearbook.

References

VPI
Virginia Tech Hokies football seasons
VPI football